Sir John in Love is an opera in four acts by the English composer Ralph Vaughan Williams. The libretto, by the composer himself, is based on Shakespeare's The Merry Wives of Windsor and supplemented with texts by Philip Sidney, Thomas Middleton, Ben Jonson, and Beaumont and Fletcher. The music deploys English folk tunes, including "Greensleeves". Originally titled The Fat Knight, the opera premiered at the Parry Opera Theatre, Royal College of Music, London, on 21 March 1929. Its first professional performance was on 9 April 1946 at Sadler's Wells Theatre.

Performance history
Performances of the opera have remained rare, including 1978 and 1988 productions by the Bronx Opera (New York City) and a 1997 Barbican concert performance. After 1958, the opera remained unstaged in the UK until the 2006 production at English National Opera (ENO), which was ENO's first production of the work. In August 2010, the Australian Shakespeare Festival, an initiative of the University of Tasmania, gave a professional concert presentation of the opera conducted by Myer Fredman. The Royal Conservatoire of Scotland gave four performances of the work in May 2015. In January 2017, the Bronx Opera performed the work as part of their 50th anniversary season.

Roles

Synopsis

Act 1
Outside Page's house, Justice Shallow and Parson Evans are angry at Sir John Falstaff and his men for getting Abraham Slender drunk and stealing his wallet. Slender is trying to compose a sonnet to express his affection for Anne Page, but cannot get past the line "O sweet Anne Page". Falstaff enters, dismissive of the anger of Shallow and Evans towards him. Anne Page, Mistress Page and Mistress Ford then arrive.

Remaining outside, Evans and Shallow conspire to arrange a match between Slender and Anne Page, and send Simple, Slender's servant, to Mistress Quickly to obtain her assistance. Anne Page then directs the men towards dinner. Left alone, she ponders her mother's wish for her to marry Dr. Caius, whom she does not desire. However, her true love, Master Fenton, then arrives. Anne Page and Fenton sing a duet, but Master Page drives off Fenton, as he thinks that Fenton is only after Anne Page's dowry. Master Page is himself inclined more towards Slender as a match for Anne.

As Fenton hides, Dr. Caius, his servant John Rugby, and Mistress Quickly appear. Caius hopes for Mistress Quickly's assistance in winning over Anne Page. Simple tries to deliver the letter from Slender, but Caius intercepts it, and after reading it, thinks that Evans also has designs on Anne Page. After Caius, Rugby and Simple depart, Fenton appears and gives Mistress Quickly a ring for Anne and some gold for herself, to assist him in winning Anne Page. The gold directs Mistress Quickly to place Fenton at the top of the list of suitors for Anne Page.

In the inn, Falstaff notes that he is facing hard financial times. He comes up with a scheme to seduce Mistresses Ford and Page and swindle them of some money. Falstaff writes identical love letters to Mistresses Ford and Page, but his henchmen Nym and Pistol refuse to be part of this scheme. Falstaff then instructs his page Robin to deliver the separate letters.

Nym and Pistol then decide to inform Master Ford of Falstaff's scheme. Ford enters, already feeling jealousy and suspicion of his wife's fidelity. When Nym and Pistol tell Ford of Falstaff's plan, Ford resolves to visit Falstaff in disguise to see how far Falstaff's plot proceeds. The merry wives, Mistresses Ford and Page, sing of cuckoos in counterpoint to Ford's rage.

Act 2
Scene 1: A room in Page's house

In Page's house, Mistress Page reads the letter to her from Falstaff. Mistress Ford then arrives with her own letter from Falstaff. The merry wives compare the letters and see that they are identical except for the names. They vow revenge on Falstaff for his attempted treachery. They engage Mistress Quickly to deliver a message to Falstaff that he should go to Alice Ford's house between ten and eleven that night.

Scene 2: The parlour of the Garter Inn

Bardolph announces to Falstaff the arrival of a visitor, Master "Brook", who is Ford in disguise. "Brook" affects to be in love with Mistress Ford, but that she has a reputation for fidelity. He offers Falstaff money to see if Falstaff can seduce Mistress Ford on his behalf. "Brook" is shocked to learn that Falstaff already has a planned assignation with Mistress Ford that night. After Falstaff leaves, Ford tears off his disguise and rages against his wife's apparent infidelity.

Act 3
Scene 1: A footpath near Windsor

Fenton asks for the Inn Host's assistance to win Anne Page. Anne arrives, initially expressing some doubts because of Fenton's past association with Falstaff, but he convinces her of his true love. She then tells him of her mother's plan to marry her off to Caius, and her father's plan to marry her off to Slender. Her intention, however, is to marry Fenton, and the Inn Host plans to find a priest to officiate a ceremony between them.

Scene 2: A field near Windsor

Caius enters, with plans to challenge Evans to a duel over Anne Page. Caius, along with Ford, Shallow, Slender and the Inn Host, meet Evans by the river bank for the duel. However, the duel between Caius and Evans gradually peters out, until the Host asks them for mutual forgiveness to each other and reconciliation at the Inn over a pint. Ford then invites the company to his house, intending to show them a "monster".

Scene 3: A room in Ford's house

At Ford's house, the merry wives, with Mistress Quickly present, are setting the trap for Falstaff, in the form of a laundry hamper. Mistress Ford instructs her servants to dump the contents of the hamper into a ditch on her command. All except Mistress Ford hide, who sings "Greensleeves" in preparation for Falstaff's arrival. Falstaff appears, but before he can start in earnest on the seduction, Mistress Quickly bursts in to warn of Mistress Page rushing over to the house. Mistress Page suddenly comes in to let everyone know that Master Ford is en route to the house in a jealous rage, which to her is part of the scheme to dupe Falstaff, except that Ford truly is on his way to the house, of which no one is aware. The only place for Falstaff to hide is the laundry basket. Falstaff therein hides, and then Ford and his followers suddenly show up, in search of the "monster" alluded to earlier. Mistress Ford directs her servants to remove the laundry basket, which they do, under great strain because of Falstaff's weight. Ford only succeeds in finding Mistress Page hidden behind a curtain.

Act 4
Scene 1: A room in Ford's house

Ford asks forgiveness from his wife, which she grants. The Fords and Pages then plot a final revenge on Falstaff, by luring him to Windsor Forest, where legend has it that Herne the Hunter haunts Herne's Oak, and fairies torment unaware travellers. Mistress Page intends to dress as the fairy queen, and with the help of local children, will taunt Falstaff. Mistress Page tells Caius that Anne will be wearing green, to allow him to find her. In turn, Master Page informs Slender that Anne will be wearing white.

Scene 2: Windsor Forest

Falstaff has received a communication from Mistress Ford to meet her at Herne's Oak, dressed as Herne the Hunter, and wearing antlers, in the hope of frightening away any intruders. The merry wives arrive, but before anything between the three of them can happen, some fairies appear and the merry wives quickly depart. Anne Page, dressed in blue, appears with a group of fairies and leads a dance around Herne's Oak. Caius and Slender each arrive, and search respectively for a fairy dressed in green and in white, which they each find and then depart. Fenton arrives and finds Anne Page, and they leave. The fairies tease Falstaff, until a horn call stops the action.

The Fords and Pages come on the scene, and Falstaff realises that he has been tricked. He takes it in good humour. Master Page now says that by this point, Anne is married to Slender. Slender arrives with his new "bride", who turns out to be young William Page in disguise. In turn, Mistress Page says that Anne is now married to Caius. Caius appears, with his "bride", who is actually Falstaff's page, Robin. Fenton and Anne finally appear, and reveal to all that they are officially married. The opera ends with a chorus of reconciliation.

Recordings
 EMI Classics: Terry Jenkins (Shallow), Rowland Jones (Sir Hugh Evans), Bernard Dickerson (Slender), David Johnston (Peter Simple), John Noble (Master Page), Raimund Herincx (Sir John Falstaff), John Winfield (Bardolph), Mark Rowlinson (Nym), Richard Van Allan (Pistol), Wendy Eathorne (Anne Page), Felicity Palmer (Mistress Page), Elizabeth Bainbridge (Mistress Ford), Robert Tear (Fenton), Gerald English (Dr Caius), Lawrence Richard (Rugby), Helen Watts (Mistress Quickly), Colin Wheatley (Host of the Garter Inn), Robert Lloyd (Master Ford), Brian Ethridge (John), Stephen Varcoe (Robert); John Alldis Choir; New Philharmonia Orchestra; Meredith Davies, conductor. Recorded London 4–13 July 1974, released 1975 as EMI 5 66123 2; digitally remastered 1997, reissued by ArkivMusic October 10, 2002 as EMI Classics 66123. Duration: 63:56+66:37 = 130:33
 Chandos CHAN 9928(2): Adrian Thompson (Shallow, solo parts; Dr Caius), Stephan Loges (Shallow, ensemble parts; Host of the Garter Inn), Stephen Varcoe (Sir Hugh Evans), Daniel Norman (Slender), Henry Moss (Peter Simple), Roderick Williams (Master Page), Donald Maxwell (Sir John Falstaff), John Bowen (Bardolph), Richard Lloyd-Morgan (Nym), Brian Bannatyne-Scott (Pistol), Susan Gritton (Anne Page), Laura Claycomb (Mistress Page), Sarah Connolly (Mistress Ford), Mark Padmore (Fenton), Mark Richardson (Rugby), Anne-Marie Owens (Mistress Quickly), Matthew Best (Master Ford); Sinfonia Chorus; Northern Sinfonia; Richard Hickox, conductor. Originally recorded in 2000; release date: June 2001. Duration: 136:27.

References

Further reading
Holden, Amanda (Ed.), The New Penguin Opera Guide, New York: Penguin Putnam, 2001.

External links

 Rob Wilton Theatricalia
 English National Opera, ENO Baylis background information on the opera, 2006

Operas by Ralph Vaughan Williams
English-language operas
1929 operas
Operas
Operas based on The Merry Wives of Windsor